Peoa is an unincorporated census-designated place in southwestern Summit County, Utah, United States, between Jordanelle and Rockport State Parks. It lies along State Route 32, south of the city of Coalville, the county seat of Summit County. The population was 253 at the 2010 census. Peoa is unincorporated with the ZIP code of 84061.

Peoa was first settled in 1857 by William W. Phelps and others.

Demographics
As of the census of 2010, there were 253 people living in the CDP. There were 109 housing units. The racial makeup of the town was 93.3% White, 0.8% Asian, 5.1% from some other race, and 0.8% from two or more races. Hispanic or Latino of any race were 9.9% of the population.

Climate
This climatic region is typified by large seasonal temperature differences, with warm to hot (and often humid) summers and cold (sometimes severely cold) winters.  According to the Köppen Climate Classification system, Peoa has a humid continental climate, abbreviated "Dfb" on climate maps.

Economy

There is currently one mink farm in Peoa. In the past there were significantly more as this was one of the town's major industries.  The mink farms have also served as a source of tension between the Summit County sheriff's department and animal rights activist groups. Air pollution from mink farming continues to be an environmental problem.Other industries that contribute to the economy of Peoa are a large rock quarry, the birthing and first-year raising of beef/cattle and growing hay. Horses, goats, alpaca and buffalo are among the other animals raised and or boarded in this area.

Peoa has basically two roads, one of which is called "Wooden Shoe Road." The name was given to the road in part by the number of Dutch and Scandinavian settlers that lived in the area who wore wooden clogs or wooden shoes. There may have been an old shop that at one point sold wooden shoes.  The other road is SR-32.

Education
It is in the South Summit School District.

See also

 List of census-designated places in Utah

References

External links

Populated places established in 1857
Census-designated places in Summit County, Utah
Census-designated places in Utah
1857 establishments in Utah Territory